Jafarabad (also Romanized as Ja‘farābād) is a village in Kharturan Rural District, Beyarjomand District, Shahrud County, Semnan Province, Iran. At the 2006 census, its population was 62, in 18 families.

References 

Populated places in Shahrud County